The 1971 Major League Baseball All-Star Game, the 42nd edition, was played on Tuesday, July 13. The all-stars from the American League and the National League faced each other at Tiger Stadium, home of the Detroit Tigers, and the home team AL won 6–4.

This was the third time that the Tigers had hosted the All-Star Game (1941, 1951); the same venue was previously known as Briggs Stadium.  It was the second All-Star Game played at night, the first in prime-time in an American League park, and the last in Tiger Stadium. When it returned 34 years later in 2005, it was at Comerica Park, the Tigers' home since 2000.

It was the American League's first win since the second game of 1962, and was their last until 1983.

National League roster 
The National League roster included fifteen future Hall of Fame players and coaches, denoted in italics.

Elected starters

Pitchers

Reserve position players

Coaching staff

American League roster 
The American League squad featured eleven future Hall of Fame players and coaches, denoted in italics.

Elected Starters

Pitchers

Reserve position players

Coaching staff

Starting lineups 
While the starters were elected by the fans, the batting orders and starting pitchers were selected by the managers.

Umpires 
Jake O'Donnell retired from umpiring after the 1971 season, after only three years on the job, but would go on to work through 1995 as a referee in the NBA, earning assignment to every NBA Finals between 1972 and 1994.  His work in this game makes him the only person to officiate in a Major League Baseball All-Star Game and an NBA All-Star Game.

Coincidentally, Denkinger wore uniform number 11 from 1980-98, the same number O'Donnell wore as an NBA official. The American League did not use uniform numbers for its umpires prior to 1980; the National League began using them in the 1960s.

Scoring summary 
With a gusty wind blowing to right, all ten runs were scored on home runs, three for each side.

The NL opened the scoring off starter Vida Blue in the top of the second inning.  Willie Stargell was hit by a pitch to lead off. With one out, 23-year-old catcher Johnny Bench hit a two-run home run into the upper deck in deep right center. In the top of the third inning, Hank Aaron launched a two-out solo home run (his first career All-Star Game extra-base hit ) into the upper deck in right off of Blue to give the NL a 3–0 lead.

The AL responded in the bottom of the third inning.  With Dock Ellis still pitching, Luis Aparicio singled to center to lead off the inning, and Reggie Jackson pinch-hit for pitcher Blue. On a 1–2 count, Jackson crushed a two-run home run high off the light tower atop the right center field roof.  Rod Carew walked, Bobby Murcer hit an infield pop fly, which drifted and was caught near first base by third baseman Joe Torre. Carl Yastrzemski flew out to left field, held up in the wind and caught by shortstop Bud Harrelson. With two outs, Frank Robinson hit a two-run home run to right to give the AL a 4–3 lead, then Norm Cash was caught looking.

In the bottom of the sixth, Cubs' pitcher Ferguson Jenkins gave up a first pitch single to center by Al Kaline of the hometown Tigers. The next batter, Harmon Killebrew, launched the third two-run home run of the game for the American League. This one was pulled to the upper deck in left, against the wind, on a full count. Brooks Robinson singled, but did not advance, as a fly out to center and a 4-6-3 double play ended the inning.

In the top of the eighth, lefthander Mickey Lolich of the Tigers caught Bobby Bonds looking, but next up was Roberto Clemente (1934–1972); in his final All-Star Game at-bat, he launched a 3–1 pitch to the upper deck in deep right center, followed by weak ground outs by Lee May and Ron Santo. 
In the ninth, Lolich retired the side in order (Lou Brock, Don Kessinger, Bench) for a six-out save.

Line score

Game notes and records 
Vida Blue was credited with the win.  Dock Ellis was credited with the loss.  Hometown favorite Mickey Lolich was credited with the save, the first official save in an MLB All-Star Game.

All of the scoring came via the home run, all six home runs hit in the game and all the runs scored were by future Hall of Fame players.  The six total home runs hit by both teams tied an All-Star Game record. Besides the home runs, the National League got singles by Bench and Tommy Davis; the American League got singles by Murcer, Kaline, Aparicio, and Brooks Robinson. All of them, except Davis and Murcer, were eventually inducted in Cooperstown

Frank Robinson became the first player in All-Star Game history to hit home runs for both leagues over the course of his career.

Reggie Jackson's home run is described as "especially memorable", as it hit one of the light standards on the roof of the stadium, credibly estimated to have landed 520 feet from home plate.

Roberto Clemente would be named to the 1972 National League squad, but would be replaced due to injury.  This game marked his final All-Star Game appearance.

Yankee catcher Thurman Munson came in to catch in the top of the eighth inning, but did not bat.

A total of 26 future Hall of Famers were present for this game: 21 players, both managers, National League coach Walt Alston, Hall of Fame umpire Doug Harvey, and future Hall of Fame manager Joe Torre.

This was the final All-Star Game in which a majority of players wore uniforms made of wool flannel. In the 1972 All-Star Game at Atlanta, only the Expos, Royals and Yankees were still wearing flannels full-time. Players from the Orioles, Pirates and Cardinals wore polyester uniforms in this All-Star Game.

References

External links 
 1971 All-Star Game summary
 1971 All-Star Game box score
 1971 All-Star Game play-by-play
 1971 All-Star Game results @mlb.com

All-Star Game
1971
1971 in Detroit
1971
Major League Baseball All Star Game
July 1971 sports events in the United States